The Franklin Engine Company was an American manufacturer of aircraft engines. Its designs were used primarily in the civilian market, both in fixed wing and helicopter designs. It was briefly directed towards automobile engines as part of the Tucker Car Corporation, returning to aviation when that company failed. The company was later purchased by the Government of Poland.

History

The firm began as the H. H. Franklin Co. in 1902 in Syracuse, New York, USA, to produce Franklin air-cooled automobiles. Barely surviving bankruptcy in 1933, the company was purchased by a group of ex-employees and renamed Aircooled Motors in 1937. While the company kept the name of "Aircooled Motors," its engines continued to be marketed under the Franklin name.  Engineers Carl Doman and Ed Marks kept the company alive through the depression by manufacturing air-cooled truck and industrial engines.

During World War II Aircooled Motors was very successful producing helicopter and airplane engines. Several aircraft carried its engines, including the Aero-Flight Streak, Bartlett Zephyr, Bell 47, Bellanca Cruisair, Brantly B-1, Goodyear Duck, H-23 Raven, Hiller 360, Piper J-3F Cub, Seibel S-4, Sikorsky S-52, Stinson Voyager, Taylorcraft 15, Temco TE-1B, and the YT-35 Buckaroo.

Aircooled Motors was purchased by Republic Aviation Company in 1945 to produce engines for its Republic Seabee light amphibious aircraft. After the war, demand for the engines dropped dramatically and Republic was unsure of the company's future.

In 1947 Aircooled Motors was purchased for the price of $1.8 million by the Tucker Car Corporation to produce an engine for the 1948 Tucker Sedan.  After purchasing Aircooled Motors, Tucker cancelled all of the company's aircraft contracts so that its resources could be focused on making automotive engines for the Tucker Corporation. This was a significant event, since at the time of Tucker's purchase Aircooled Motors held over 65% of postwar U.S. aviation engine production contracts.  For this reason, when the Tucker Car Corporation failed amidst allegations of stock fraud, Aircooled nearly failed with it.

Tucker and the Tucker family owned the firm until 1961, when it was sold to Aero Industries, which restored the name Franklin Engine Company.

In 1975 the government of Poland bought the company and moved it to Rzeszów, first under the name PZL-Franklin and later PZL-F.

The company is now called Franklin Aircraft Engines Sp. z o.o. with the address ul. Chełmińska 208 in 86-300 Grudziądz city in Poland. At Aero Friedrichshafen 2016 the company had new engines on display. The innovations include modifications to the type certificate of the 6A-350; the approval for MOGAS, as well as fuel injection is pending at EASA.

Products

Note: The engine displacement designations are fictional unless the engine was given a designation by the US military

See also
 Jacobs Aircraft Engine Company
 List of aircraft engine manufacturers
 List of aircraft engines

References
 Notes 

 Bibliography 

 Gunston, Bill. (1986). World Encyclopedia of Aero Engines''. Patrick Stephens, Wellingborough. p. 57

External links

 www.wskrz.com — WSK "PZL-Rzeszów" S. A., Polish manufacturer of Franklin engines

Defunct aircraft engine manufacturers of the United States
Companies based in Syracuse, New York
Franklin aircraft engines